Jhon Stiwar García Mena (born 6 September 1990) is a Colombian professional footballer who plays for Finnish club KuPS, as a midfielder.

References

1990 births
Living people
Colombian footballers
Colombian expatriate footballers
Atlético Nacional footballers
Real Santander footballers
Alianza Petrolera players
América de Cali footballers
Fortaleza C.E.I.F. footballers
Atlético Bucaramanga footballers
Deportivo Pereira footballers
Kuopion Palloseura players
SC Kuopio Futis-98 players
Nacional Potosí players
Jaguares de Córdoba footballers
Patriotas Boyacá footballers
Categoría Primera A players
Categoría Primera B players
Veikkausliiga players
Kakkonen players
Bolivian Primera División players
Association football defenders
Colombian expatriate sportspeople in Finland
Colombian expatriate sportspeople in Bolivia
Expatriate footballers in Finland
Expatriate footballers in Bolivia
People from Quibdó
Sportspeople from Chocó Department